Kwarta may refer to:
Kwarta tax, in Polish-Lithuanian Commonwealth
Kwarta, in obsolete Polish units of measurement
Kwarta, in Maltese units of measurement
PS Kwarta, Indonesian football club